Romy María Schmidt Crnosija (born November 18, 1965) is a lawyer, academic, researcher and Chilean politician. She was the Minister of National Assets for President Michelle Bachelet from March 11, 2006, until January 6, 2010.

Schmidt studied at the Liceo Manuel de Salas in Santiago. She received a law degree from the Central University of Chile (1994) and obtained a master's degree in Disability at the University of Salamanca, Spain (1997).

Between 1998 and 1999 Schmidt served as an external consultant of the International Labour Organization (ILO).

From 1997 to 2005 Schmidt was a professor of labor law courses at the School of Civil Engineering of the Central University of Chile, and professor of disability legislation in the School of Occupational Therapy at the Universidad Mayor.

Since 2002, state taxes are collected by the National Disability Fund (Fonadis), which is in charge of legislative work that the agency conducts with the National Congress.

In 2004, Schmidt was both adviser to the Ministry General Secretariat of Government and Vice President of the National Board of Kindergarten Schools (JUNJI).

After Schmidt's ministry was over, she was appointed by Bachelet in early 2010 as the first director of the Museum of Memory and Human Rights.

She is a member of the Party for Democracy (PPD), and is married to the sociologist and politician, Antonio Leal.

References

1965 births
Living people
Chilean people of Croatian descent
Chilean people of German descent
Chilean women lawyers
Chilean agnostics
Party for Democracy (Chile) politicians
Government ministers of Chile
Central University of Chile alumni
University of Salamanca alumni
Women government ministers of Chile
20th-century Chilean lawyers
21st-century Chilean lawyers